R62 may refer to:
 R62 (New York City Subway car)
 R62 (South Africa), a road
 HD 32034, a star
 , a destroyer of the Royal Navy
 , an aircraft carrier of the Royal Navy
 R62: Possible risk of impaired fertility, a risk phrase in chemistry